The 2018 Welsh Conservatives leadership election was triggered on 27 June by the resignation of Andrew RT Davies.

Davies had led the Welsh Conservatives since 14 July 2011.

Paul Davies won the contest and became the new leader.

Procedure

Candidates require a total of four nominations from Conservative AMs, including themselves, to stand.

If there are three or more candidates, Conservative AMs vote until there are two candidates, who are then voted on by the party's membership.

Timetable

Campaign

Leader Andrew RT Davies stood down in June 2018. WalesOnline reported that this was because he felt he did not have the full support of the Conservative group. He told the BBC that he had been aware of plans to remove him for more than a year. His departure was credited to what The Guardian described as his "uncompromising" support for Brexit.

Deputy Leader Paul Davies was appointed as an Interim Leader, and announced that he would stand for the permanent leadership.

In July, Suzy Davies announced she would stand, saying that she thought it was important for the Welsh Conservatives to have a contested election. She said she would be willing to work with Plaid Cymru to get rid of the Labour government in Wales. She supported reducing taxes, as well as giving some business rates proceeds to councils to use them for private sector-led local development strategies. Suzy Davies also argued for giving the private sector a "real stake in the communities in which they develop" and giving workers an "emotional stake" in their employers.

Paul Davies launched his campaign in Gwent, pledging to give Welsh Conservative Party members a vote on any potential coalition in the Welsh Assembly. He said he would consider cutting taxes in Wales, as well as supporting high street businesses and redesign the business rates system.

The South Wales Argus described Paul Davies as having the support of "most of the big hitters in the party".

Candidates

Declined

Russell George, AM for Montgomeryshire since 2011
David Melding, AM for South Wales Central since 1999, Deputy Presiding Officer from 2011 to 2016
Darren Millar, AM for Clwyd West since 2007, Shadow Minister for Education since 2016

See also

2018 Welsh Labour Party leadership election
2018 Plaid Cymru leadership election
Next National Assembly for Wales election

References

2018 elections in the United Kingdom
Conservative Party (UK)
2018 in Wales
2010s elections in Wales
Political party leadership elections in Wales
Welsh Conservatives leadership election